Pests and diseases of cereals:

List of barley diseases
List of maize diseases
List of insect pests of millets
List of pearl millet diseases
List of oat diseases
List of rice diseases
List of wild rice diseases
List of rye diseases
List of sorghum diseases
:Category:Triticale diseases
List of wheat diseases
:Category:Insect pests of wheat